

Events 
 January–March 

 January 8 – Michiel de Ruyter marries the widow Anna van Gelder and plans retirement, but months later becomes a vice-commodore in the First Anglo-Dutch War.
 February 4 – At Edinburgh, the parliamentary commissioners of the Commonwealth of England proclaim the Tender of Union to be in force in Scotland, annexing the Scottish nation with the concession that Scotland would have 30 representatives in the parliament of the English Commonwealth.  
 February 12 – Oliver Cromwell, England's Lord Protector, announces that his Council of Scotland will regulate church affairs as part of the Terms of Incorporation of Scotland into England, and eliminates Presbyterianism as Scotland's state religion.
 March 29 – A total solar eclipse occurs on (Black Monday, or on 8 April New Style in the Gregorian calendar).

 April–June 
 April 6 – Dutch sailor Jan van Riebeeck establishes a resupply camp for the Dutch East India Company at the Cape of Good Hope in what is now South Africa, thus founding Cape Town.
 May 18 – Rhode Island passes the first law in North America making slavery illegal.
 May 19 (May 29, Gregorian calendar) – First Anglo-Dutch War – Battle of Dover: The opening battle is fought off Dover, between Lt.-Admiral Maarten Harpertszoon Tromp's 42 Dutch ships and 21 English ships divided into two squadrons, one commanded by Robert Blake and the other by Nehemiah Bourne; the result is inconclusive.
 June 13 – George Fox preaches to a large crowd on Firbank Fell in England, leading to the establishment of the Religious Society of Friends (Quakers).

 July–September 
 July 2 – The Battle of the Faubourg St Antoine is fought east of Paris between the French Parliamentarians (led by Louis, Grand Condé) against the army of King Louis XIV, commanded by the Viscount of Turenne, with neither side prevailing.
 July 4 – A mob kills 150 people, including judges, in the massacre at the Hôtel de Ville in Paris. 
 July 5 – A treaty is signed between the Province of Maryland and the Conestoga Indians, ceding most of the land around the Chesapeake Bay to the English colonists.
 July 10 – The First Anglo-Dutch War begins as the English Commonwealth declares war against the Dutch Republic. 
 July 17 – The "Great Fire of Glasgow" destroys one-third of the Scottish city.
 August 26 – During the First Anglo-Dutch War, in the Battle of Plymouth, a fleet from the England attacks an outward-bound convoy of the United Provinces, escorted by 23 men-of-war and six fire ships, commanded by Vice-Commodore Michiel de Ruyter; the Dutch escape.
 September 11– The Guo Huaiyi Rebellion, a peasant revolt on the island of Taiwan against colonial rule in Dutch Formosa is suppressed after four days.

 October–December  
 October 2 – The Great Fire of Oulu destroys almost all of the houses of the town’s bourgeoisie, the provision warehouses and the drawbridge of Oulu Castle,  in the town of Oulu, Finland.
 November 30 – The Netherlands takes control of the English Channel after the Battle of Dungeness ends in a Dutch victory over the English Royal Navy.
 December 10 – First Anglo-Dutch War: Defeat at the Battle of Dungeness causes the Commonwealth of England to reform its navy.

Births 

 January 2
 Sir Gilbert Heathcote, 1st Baronet, Lord Mayor of London (d. 1733)
 Michel Chamillart, French statesman (d. 1721)
 January 7 – Pavao Ritter Vitezović, Croatian historian (d. 1713)
 January 8 – Wilhelm Homberg, Dutch alchemist (d. 1715)
 January 11 – Eugen Alexander Franz, 1st Prince of Thurn and Taxis, Germany (d. 1714)
 January 13 – Henry Booth, 1st Earl of Warrington, English politician (d. 1694)
 January 16 – Anthony Ashley-Cooper, 2nd Earl of Shaftesbury, English politician (d. 1699)
 January 17 – Claude-Guy Hallé, French painter (d. 1736)
 February 6 – Francesco Pignatelli, Italian Catholic cardinal (d. 1734)
 February 13 
 Anton Domenico Gabbiani, Italian painter (d. 1726)
 August, Duke of Schleswig-Holstein-Sonderburg-Beck (d. 1689)
 February 14 – Camille d'Hostun, duc de Tallard, Marshal of France (d. 1728)
 March 1 – Louis de Sabran, British theologian (d. 1732)
 March 3 – Thomas Otway, English dramatist (d. 1685)
 March 10 – Giacomo Serpotta, Italian artist (d. 1732)
 March 12 – Johann Heinrich Ernesti, German philosopher, theologian (d. 1729)
 March 14 – Benedicta Henrietta of the Palatinate, German princess (d. 1730)
 March 20 – Leon Bazyli Sapieha, Polish-Lithuanian politician (d. 1686)
 March 21 – Piers Butler, 3rd Viscount Galmoye, Anglo-Irish nobleman (d. 1740)
 March 28 – Samuel Sewall, English-born Massachusetts judge (d. 1730)
 April 7 – Pope Clement XII (d. 1740)
 April 9
 Jean Le Fèvre (astronomer), French astronomer (d. 1706)
 Christian Ulrich I, Duke of Württemberg-Oels (d. 1704)
 April 13 – Thomas Ward (author), English writer (d. 1708)
 April 21 – Michel Rolle, French mathematician (d. 1719)
 April 25
 Boris Sheremetev, Russian noble (d. 1719)
 Giovanni Battista Foggini, Italian artist (d. 1725)
 April 28 – Magdalena Sibylla of Hesse-Darmstadt, regent and composer (d. 1712)
 May 1 – John King (Rector of Chelsea), English churchman (d. 1732)
 May 2 – Abraham Hinckelmann, German Protestant theologian (d. 1695)
 May 7 – Edward Northey (barrister), British barrister and politician (d. 1723)
 May 11 – Johann Philipp d'Arco, Austrian soldier (d. 1704)
 May 14 
 Juliana of Hesse-Eschwege, German noblewoman (d. 1693)
 Johann Philipp Förtsch, German opera composer (d. 1732)
 May 20 – Ichijō Kaneteru, Japanese court noble (d. 1705)
 May 27 – Elizabeth Charlotte, Princess Palatine, wife to Philippe I, Duke of Orléans (d. 1722)
 June 1 – Juan Ferreras, Spanish priest (d. 1735)
 June 23 – Jan Brokoff, German sculptor (d. 1718)
 August 3 – Samuel Western, English politician (d. 1699)
 August 15 
 John Grubb, American politician (d. 1708)
 John Wise (clergyman), American Christian clergyman (d. 1725)
 August 26 – Tsarevna Marfa Alekseyevna of Russia (d. 1707)
 August 31 – Ferdinando Carlo Gonzaga, Duke of Mantua and Montferrat, only child of Duke Charles II (d. 1708)
 September 4 
 Jean Orry, French economist (d. 1719)
 Tokugawa Tsunanari, Japanese daimyō (d. 1699)
 September 8 – Luisa Roldán, Spanish artist (d. 1706)
 September 10 – Jan Sladký Kozina, Czech revolutionary (d. 1695)
 September 12 – Frederick Charles, Duke of Württemberg-Winnental (d. 1697)
 October 11 – Nathaniel Higginson, English politician (d. 1708)
 October 16
 Karl, Prince of Anhalt-Zerbst (d. 1718)
 Jan Mortel, painter from the Northern Netherlands (d. 1719)
 October 29 – Jan Wyck, Dutch military painter (d. 1702)
 November 1 – William Lowndes, English politician (d. 1724)
 November 3 – Louis, Duke of Rohan, French noble (d. 1727)
 November 4 – Marc-René de Voyer de Paulmy d'Argenson (1652–1721), French politician (d. 1721)
 November 9 – Marie Anne d'Orléans, French princess (d. 1656)
 November 10 – Johann Ernst Glück, German theologian, translator (d. 1705)
 December 2 – Karolina of Legnica-Brieg, Silesian noblewoman (d. 1707)
 December 9
 Augustus Quirinus Rivinus, German physician and botanist (d. 1723)
 Robert Rochfort, Irish politician (d. 1727)
 December 10 – Frederick, Duke of Schleswig-Holstein-Sonderburg-Augustenburg, German nobleman (d. 1692)
 December 20 – Samuel Bradford, English churchman, Whig politician (d. 1731)
 December 25 – Archibald Pitcairne, Scottish physician (d. 1713)

Deaths 

 January 19 – Vilem Slavata of Chlum, Czech nobleman (b. 1572)
 January 30 – Georges de La Tour, French Baroque painter (b. 1593)
 February 7 – Gregorio Allegri, Italian composer (b. 1582)
 February 28 – Arcangela Tarabotti, Venetian nun and feminist (b. 1604)
 March 12 – Aloysius Gottifredi, Italian Jesuit (b. 1595)
 March 17 – Benjamin Bramer, German mathematician (b. 1588)
 April 13 – Georges Fournier, French Jesuit mathematician and geographer (b. 1595)
 April 17 – Henry Howard, 22nd Earl of Arundel, English politician (b. 1608)
 April 19 – Jesper Brochmand, Danish bishop (b. 1585)
 April 21 – Pietro Della Valle, Italian traveller (b. 1586)
 April 26 – Jean-Pierre Camus, French Catholic bishop (b. 1584)
 May 11 (bur.) – Eva Ment, Dutch culture personality (b. 1606)
 May 10 
 Jacques Buteux, French missionary (b. 1600)
 Jacques-Nompar de Caumont, duc de La Force, Marshal of France (b. 1558)
 June 3 – Marek Sobieski, Polish noble (szlachcic) (b. 1628)
 June 9
 Anna Sophie of Anhalt, German noblewoman (b. 1584)
 Jean Dolbeau, French missionary (b. 1586)
 June 18 – John Casimir, Count Palatine of Kleeburg, son of John I (b. 1589)
 June 21 – Inigo Jones, English architect (b. 1573)
 June 25 – Abraham von Franckenberg, German writer (b. 1593)
 July 14 – Otto Heurnius, Dutch physician and philosopher (b. 1577)
 July 23 – Johannes Chrysostomus vander Sterre, Dutch abbot, ecclesiastical writer (b. 1591)
 July 25 – Bonaventura Peeters the Elder, Flemish marine painter (b. 1614)
 July 30 – Charles Amadeus, Duke of Nemours (b. 1624)
 August 9 – Frédéric Maurice de La Tour d'Auvergne, prince of the independent principality of Sedan (b. 1605)
 August 10 – Jean Gaston, Duke of Valois (b. 1650)
 August 14 – Abraham Elzevir, Dutch printer (b. 1592)
 August 18 – Florimond de Beaune, French mathematician and jurist (b. 1601)
 August 22 – Jacob De la Gardie, Swedish soldier and statesman (b. 1583)
 August 23 – John Byron, 1st Baron Byron, English royalist politician (b. 1600)
 September 2 – Jusepe de Ribera, Spanish Tenebrist painter and printmaker (b. 1591)
 September 6 – Philippe Alegambe, Belgian Jesuit priest and bibliographer (b. 1592)
 September 7 – Patrick Young, Scottish librarian (b. 1584)
 September 16 – Giulio Roma, Italian Catholic cardinal (b. 1584)
 September 17 – Sumitomo Masatomo (b. 1585)
 October 8 – John Greaves, English mathematician and antiquarian (b. 1602)
 October 11 – Léon Bouthillier, comte de Chavigny, French politician (b. 1608)
 October 20 – Antonio Coello, Spanish writer (b. 1611)
 November 4 – Jean-Charles della Faille, Belgian mathematician (b. 1597)
 November 7 – Henry of Nassau-Siegen, German count, officer in the Dutch Army, diplomat for the Dutch Republic (b. 1611)
 November 11 – John Bridgeman, British bishop (b. 1577)
 November 21 – Jan Brożek, Polish mathematician, physician, and astronomer (b. 1585)
 December 11 – Denis Pétau, French theologian and historian (b. 1583)
 December 23 – John Cotton, founder of Boston, Massachusetts (b. 1585)
 date unknown
 Johannes Gysius – Dutch historian (b. circa 1583)
 Prince Luarsab of Kartli – heir apparent to the throne of the Kingdom of Kartli

References 

 
Leap years in the Gregorian calendar